Namilyango College is a boys-only boarding middle and high school located in Mukono District in the Central Region of Uganda, whose history and excellence in sports and academics have made it one of the most prestigious schools in Uganda. It is Uganda's oldest secondary school, founded in 1902 by the Catholic Mill Hill Fathers.

Location
The coordinates of Namilyango College are:0°20'19.0"N, 32°43'02.0"E (Latitude:0.338611; Longitude:32.717222).

History
The school was founded in March 1902 by the Mill Hill Fathers, a London-based Catholic missionary society, to educate the sons of Catholic chiefs. At the time, the Mill Hill Missionaries approach to education for locals was guided by their objective of training local catechists and, eventually, local priests. The first students at Namilyango were being trained to become, first and foremost, catechists; those who were considered unfit for that vocation would be sent away or, if they were of good character, educated further so they could be taken on as clerks in the colonial government.

Reputation
Namilyango College is one of the most prestigious schools in Uganda, owing to its history, influence, excellent academic performance and dominance in sports. It is the oldest secondary school and the first college in Uganda, and for long was the best school in boxing until the sport was stopped in the school in the early 1990s. Rugby is the biggest sport in the College. Namilyango has won the national schools' rugby title more than any other school, and has sent numerous players to the national team. Namilyango College was a pioneer in Information Technology in Ugandan schools, building one of the first computer labs.

Rivalries
Over the years a tradition of Namilyango College has been the rivalries with fellow prestigious schools, in Academics, Sports and socialising. The rivals have included, in decreasing order of rivalry: St. Mary's College Kisubi, King's College Budo and Busoga College Mwiri. In recent times the bad blood has been with Budo and SMACK (Kisubi) for the Rugby honours, as Namilyango has won five schools' championships in the last eight years - including the 2012 Championship, compared to one, each, for their rivals. On the other hand, the school has maintained cordial relations with schools like: Gayaza High School, Mount Saint Mary's College Namagunga and Trinity College Nabbingo.

Houses of residence

The college has eleven residential houses and a hostel. The "O" Level students reside in the residential houses while the "A" Level students reside in Minderop Hostel, named after Father James Minderop, the first headmaster of the college. The eleven residential houses are:

 Biermans House - Named after Bishop John Biermans (MHM), Vicariate Apostolic of Upper Nile 1912 - 1924
 Billington House - Named after Bishop Vincent Billington (MHM) (1904 - 1976), Bishop of Kampala 1953 - 1965
 Campling House - Named after Bishop John William Campling (MHM), Vicariate Apostolic of Upper Nile 1925 - 1937
 Doyle House - Named after Rev. Fr. Captain Bernard Doyle (MHM), the longest serving Headmaster (19 years) of the College
 Hanlon House - "House of Lords", named after Bishop Henry Hanlon (MHM) 1862 - 1937, Vicar Apostolic of Upper Nile 1894 - 1911 
 Kiwanuka House - Named after Archbishop Joseph Kiwanuka, the first native African to be appointed Archbishop of the Roman Catholic Church in East Africa
 Kuipers House - Named after Father Bernard Kuipers (MHM), served the College for 30 years as teacher, Headmaster, and Chaplain
 McKee House - Named after Father Kevin McKee (MHM), a teacher at the College
 Mukasa House - Named after Mr. Noah Mukasa, a former Biology teacher at the College
 Reesinck House - Named after Bishop John Reesinck (MHM), Vicariate Apostolic of Upper Nile 1938 - 1950
 Heweston House - Named after one of the former headmasters of the school.
 Charles Lwanga House - Named after one of the Uganda Martyrs

Prominent alumni
Former students of Namilyango College are called "Old Ngonians", and include a prime minister, the current Chief Justice, cabinet ministers, clergymen, members of the royal family of Buganda, judges, lawyers, academics, and sportsmen. Some of the prominent alumni of the school include:

Royals
Prince David Wasajja of Buganda Kingdom

Politics
George Cosmas Adyebo, Prime Minister 1991–1994 
Gerald Ssendaula, minister of finance 1998–2005 and MP for Bukoto 1980–2005
Fred Mukisa (McKee), minister for fisheries 2006–2011 and MP for Bukooli Central 2006–2011
Vincent Nyanzi, minister of state for vice president's Office and MP for Busujju County
Norbert Mao (Campling), Democratic Party 2011 presidential candidate and President of DP 2010 - date
Jeremiah Twatwa, MP for Iki-Iki County 
Martin Drito (Reensich), MP for Madi-Okollo County, Arua District, 2011 to present. One of Uganda's wealthiest individuals.
 Gabriel Ajedra Aridru, former State Minister of Finance for General Duties in the Cabinet of Uganda.

Law
Bart Magunda Katureebe, Former Chief Justice of Uganda and former member of the Supreme Court of Uganda,

Civil service
Onegi Obel, Governor, Bank of Uganda 1973–1978 and presidential advisor
Geoffrey Onegi Obel, former chairman, NSSF board of directors
 Joseph Etima (d. 22 June 2018), former Commissioner of Uganda Human Rights Commission and former Commissioner General of Uganda Prisons.

Academics
John Ssebuwufu, vice chancellor, Makerere University 1993–2004. Chancellor, Kyambogo University 2014–Present
Nelson Sewankambo FRCP, principal, Makerere University College of Health Sciences 
David Serwadda, dean Makerere University School of Public Health
Emmanuel Mbaziira, Chemistry teacher and games master Ndejje S S S
Okitwi Pius, Physics and Mathematics teacher At the College
Josephine Nambooze, the first indigenous female doctor in Uganda, and later medicine professor at Makerere University College of Health Sciences
 Peregrine Kibuuka PhD: Former headmaster Namilyango College, 1986–2001.

Writers
Austin Bukenya, author, playwright, and literary scholar

Other
 Emmanuel Katongole (Campling), Managing Director Quality Chemicals & CEO Vero Foods Limited. Current chairman of Uganda National Oil Company.
 Geoffrey Scott Sempiiga (d. 21 July 2013), (Campling), Cargo Manager KLM Uganda & CEO GSS Enterprise Limited, Katwine Shipping Company and GSS Music Industriè.

See also
 Education in Uganda
 Namilyango

References

Further reading
 Gale, Hubert P, Uganda And The Mill Hill Fathers (London, Macmillan, 1959, OCLC 1608574)
 O'Neil, Robert J, Mission To The Upper Nile: Story of St.Joseph's Missionary Society of Mill Hill in Uganda (London, Mission Book Services, 1999)

External links
Namilyango College Celebrates 112 Years of Existence
Namilyango College Homepage
Namilyango College Angelfire Website
Namilyango College Is 105 Years Old 
Profile at Newvision.co.ug
Profile at Monitor.co.ug

Boarding schools in Uganda
Boys' schools in Uganda
Secondary schools in Uganda
Education in Uganda
Mukono District
Central Region, Uganda
1902 establishments in the British Empire
Catholic universities and colleges in Africa
Educational institutions established in 1902